Ericeia rectifascia is a moth in the family Erebidae. It is found on Sumatra, Java and Borneo.

References

Moths described in 1928
Ericeia